The White EP may refer to:

 The White (Agalloch EP), 2008
 The White (William Control EP), 2017
 The White EP (Mirrors EP), 2011
 The White EP (Pop-O-Pies EP), 1982
 The White EP (Vib Gyor EP), 2007

See also 
 The White Album (disambiguation)
 White (disambiguation)